Mary Gregory (1856–1908) was an American artist specializing in glass painting.

Mary Gregory may also refer to:

Mary Rogers Gregory (1846–1919), American portrait artist
Sister Mary Gregory (1928–2013), American author, educator and theologian, also known as Jeanne Knoerle
Elizabeth Fitzhenry (before 1735–c. 1790), Irish actress also credited as Mary Gregory
E. Mary Gregory, American plaintiff in 1885 Supreme Court case of Gregory v. Hartley